Rayan Vitor Simplício Rocha (born 3 August 2006), known simply as Rayan, is a Brazilian footballer who plays as a forward for Vasco da Gama.

Club career
Born in Rio de Janeiro, Rayan joined Vasco da Gama at the age of six. He established a name for himself as a prolific goal-scorer, scoring 280 goals by the age of eleven. He continued this form into Vasco's under-17 team, scoring 29 goals in 34 games in 2022, catching the eye of Spanish side Barcelona.

International career
Rayan was called up to the Brazil under-17 squad for friendlies against Chile and Paraguay in 2022; he scored twice in four games.

Personal life
His father, Valkmar, also played for Vasco de Gama, representing the club as a defender between 1995 and 2000.

Career statistics

Club

References

2006 births
Living people
Footballers from Rio de Janeiro (city)
Brazilian footballers
Brazil youth international footballers
Association football forwards
CR Vasco da Gama players